The Fee Glacier is a  long glacier (2005) situated in the Pennine Alps in the canton of Valais in Switzerland. It lies east of the Mischabel range, between the summit of Dom on the north and Allalinhorn on the south.

The glacier is easily accessible via the Mittelallalin cable car and is used as a ski area.

See also
List of glaciers in Switzerland
List of glaciers
Retreat of glaciers since 1850
Swiss Alps

External links
Swiss glacier monitoring network

Glaciers of the Alps
Glaciers of Valais